Sophie Gombya is a Ugandan musician and social activist. She is married to fellow musician Sam Gombya.

Early life and education
Sophie went to Nakivubo Blue Primary School and then to Kawempe Muslim and later Kibibi Senior Secondary School.

Music

Sophie Gomba sings with a sharp soprano and performs with her husband Sam Gombya. She has successful singles like "Spare tyre" about a woman with whom she is competing for the same man. It was written by her husband Sam. They have six albums together.

Discography

Songs
Nkwesize
Gyangu gyendi
Lugya Lumu
Spare tyre
Sosotola
Salawo
Ngugumuka ekiro
Ssebo Muko
Mwenyumirizamu

Albums with Sam Gombya
Nkwesize Mu Bbuba

References

External links 
"Sophie Gombya Poisoned"
"Entertainment couples"

Living people
21st-century Ugandan women singers
Kumusha
Year of birth missing (living people)